The Walter Castor was a Czechoslovakian seven-cylinder, air-cooled radial engine for powering aircraft that was developed in the late 1920s. The Super Castor was a nine-cylinder development. Castor I production began in 1928, Castor II in 1932 and the Castor III in 1934.

Applications
Aero A.35
Aero A.304 (Super Castor)
Airspeed Envoy
Breda Ba.25
Dornier Do K
Fizir F1V 
Hopfner HV-6/28
Letov Š-28
Rogozarski AZR
Savoia-Marchetti S.71

Engines on display
A preserved example of the Walter Castor engine is on display at the following museum:
Prague Aviation Museum, Kbely

Specifications (Castor I)

See also

References

Notes

Bibliography

 Gunston, Bill. World Encyclopedia of Aero Engines. Cambridge, England. Patrick Stephens Limited, 1989. 

Castor
1920s aircraft piston engines
Aircraft air-cooled radial piston engines